Pammene ignorata is a moth of the family Tortricidae. In Europe it is found in Great Britain, the Benelux, Fennoscandia, Switzerland, Austria, the Czech Republic, Hungary, Poland and the Baltic region, east to the eastern parts of the Palearctic realm.

Adults are on wing from May to July.

The larvae feed on Tilia and Ulmus species.

External links
UKmoths
Fauna Europaea

Olethreutinae
Moths of Europe
Moths described in 1968
Moths of Japan
Moths of Asia